The 2004 UTEP Miners football team represented the University of Texas at El Paso in the 2004 NCAA Division I-A football season. The team's head coach was Mike Price. The Miners played their home games at the Sun Bowl Stadium in El Paso, Texas. This was the team's final season participating in the Western Athletic Conference. UTEP averaged 41,209 fans per game.

Schedule

References

UTEP
UTEP Miners football seasons
UTEP Miners football